Brandan Parfitt (born 27 April 1998) is a professional Australian rules footballer playing for the Geelong Football Club in the Australian Football League (AFL).

Early life
Parfitt was born and raised in Darwin, Northern Territory and is of indigenous Australian heritage. He is Larrakia and Warumungu. He spent much of his junior football at the Nightcliff Football Club in Darwin.

AFL career
He was drafted by the Geelong Football Club with their first selection and twenty-sixth overall in the 2016 national draft. He made his debut in the forty-two point win against  in the opening round of the 2017 season at Domain Stadium. After his third match, he was named the round nominee for the rising star for his performance in the twenty-nine point win against  at Etihad Stadium in round three, in which he recorded twenty-three disposals and five tackles.

Statistics
Updated to the end of the 2022 season.

|-
| 2017 ||  || 3
| 15 || 6 || 4 || 100 || 97 || 197 || 29 || 51 || 0.4 || 0.3 || 6.7 || 6.5 || 13.1 || 1.9 || 3.4 || 0
|-
| 2018 ||  || 3
| 19 || 15 || 7 || 164 || 178 || 342 || 50 || 85 || 0.8 || 0.4 || 8.6 || 9.4 || 18.0 || 2.6 || 4.5 || 3
|-
| 2019 ||  || 3
| 20 || 4 || 4 || 190 || 174 || 364 || 39 || 105 || 0.2 || 0.2 || 9.5 || 8.7 || 18.2 || 2.0 || 5.3 || 2
|-
| 2020 ||  || 3
| 18 || 8 || 6 || 148 || 131 || 279 || 31 || 107 || 0.4 || 0.3 || 8.2 || 7.3 || 15.5 || 1.7 || 5.9 || 2
|-
| 2021 ||  || 3
| 23 || 8 || 7 || 225 || 207 || 432 || 32 || 128 || 0.3 || 0.3 || 9.7 || 9.0 || 18.7 || 1.3 || 5.5 || 6
|-
| scope=row bgcolor=F0E68C | 2022# ||  || 3
| 17 || 5 || 4 || 168 || 180 || 348 || 32 || 80 || 0.3 || 0.2 || 9.9 || 10.6 || 20.5 || 1.9 || 4.7 || 0
|- class=sortbottom
! colspan=3 | Career
! 112 !! 46 !! 32 !! 995 !! 967 !! 1962 !! 213 !! 556 !! 0.4 !! 0.3 !! 8.9 !! 8.6 !! 17.5 !! 1.9 !! 5.0 !! 13
|}

Notes

Honours and achievements
Team
 AFL premiership player: 2022
 2× McClelland Trophy: 2019, 2022

Individual
 AFL Rising Star nominee: 2017 (round 3)

References

External links

1998 births
Living people
Geelong Football Club players
Geelong Football Club Premiership players
Nightcliff Football Club players
North Adelaide Football Club players
Australian rules footballers from the Northern Territory
Indigenous Australian players of Australian rules football
One-time VFL/AFL Premiership players